Raaginder Singh Momi (/ɹɔɚɡdɝ/; born November 27, 1992) better known by his stage name raaginder is a Union City, California based violinist, music producer and songwriter of Indian descent. His professional music career began in 2011 when he released his first mixtape Take One... on December 11, 2011, following up with his debut studio album Beach Chair on October 29, 2014 and later his first EP, escape released December 28, 2017.

Early life and career

Born into a musical family, Raaginder's father being a professional sitar player and his mother being a vocalist, Raaginder was exposed to different types of music. He first started playing violin when he was 11 years old. Later in 2004, he became a disciple of a renowned Indian classical artist, Sisirkana Dhar Chowdhury after his father found an ad of her in India Currents Magazine and discovered she was teaching in Fremont, California, becoming Chowdhury's pupil, Raaginder has been under her guidance ever since. Being exposed to different types of music, Raaginder has experimented and tried playing different genres of music such as Hip-Hop, Punjabi, Indian classical and more. After high school, Raaginder began producing beats and infusing genres to create his sound. Doing covers, he would post his covers to download sites like mediafire until encouraged to post on YouTube. He cites YouTube as helping to jump start his career.

Raaginder has also played the United States national anthem for the Los Angeles Clippers and played at the White House on numerous occasions. In the wake of the 2016 elections, Raaginder also stated his opinion on the outcome.

Music

Sound, Image, and Name

In an interview with NBC News Asia, Raaginder stated about his musical sound, "Music can be interpreted in any way. I try to make music that's universal to every aspect ...the one obvious message is my identity. I want my identity to be known with my music. This turban and beard, I feel like, is a big part of why I am where I am today. So even though I'll do a 'Hotline Bling' cover, the fact that there's aspects of the music that are foreign and even the aspects of me – the way I look – I think that makes a difference because it's something people haven't seen, and it's something people need to see."

In an interview with Brown Girl Magazine, Raaginder stated; "the neighborhood I lived in and the school I went to was primarily Latino and Black. Due to that, the first genre of music I was drawn to when I moved to America was hip-hop. Hip-Hop was the gateway for me to be relatable to the other students. Everyone around the school knew all of the hits word for word and I started picking it up as well. I know it was a shock to many kids around me that a little-turbaned boy from Asia listened to rap on the regular. Around the same time, I had started to learn the violin (in the classical and Indian classical tradition). Although Indian classical violin was completely left field from hip-hop, they both instilled resiliency and confidence in me which allowed me to defend myself and be comfortable in my own skin. What started as a tool to connect with others, ended up becoming my identity over the years. It got to the point where a couple of my friends started calling me “Violinder.”

Personal life
In 2014 Raaginder's mother died from cancer. He sites her as his main inspiration for actively pursuing music. The song "Raindrops" from his studio album Beach Chair was dedicated in her honor. Raaginder is also the eldest of two children.

Raaginder also studied at the California Institute of the Arts (Cal Arts) where he received his Bachelor of Fine Arts in world music performance.

Discography

Studio albums

 Beach Chair (2014)
 Moment in Time (2020)
 Letters From the Other Side (2022)

EPs
escape (2017)

Mixtapes

Take One... (2011)

Singles

Features

Music videos

Voice Over

See also
List of Indian musicians
List of people from California

References

External links
 www.raaginder.com

Living people
Musicians from Bangkok
Thai people of Indian descent
1992 births
21st-century Thai musicians
Kamboj